Jan "Loep" de Looper (2 May 1914 – 23 June 1987) was a Dutch field hockey player who competed in the 1936 Summer Olympics.

He was born and died in Hilversum.

He was a member of the Dutch field hockey team, which won the bronze medal. He played all five matches as goalkeeper.

His older brother Henk de Looper was his teammate.

External links
 
profile

1914 births
1987 deaths
Dutch male field hockey players
Olympic field hockey players of the Netherlands
Field hockey players at the 1936 Summer Olympics
Olympic bronze medalists for the Netherlands
Sportspeople from Hilversum
Olympic medalists in field hockey
Medalists at the 1936 Summer Olympics
20th-century Dutch people